Caraí is a Brazilian municipality located in the northeast of the state of Minas Gerais. Its population  was estimated to be 23,780 people living in a total area of 1,240 km2. The city belongs to the mesoregion of Jequitinhonha and to the microregion of Araçuaí.  The elevation of the municipal seat is 750 meters.  It became a municipality in 1948.

The economy is based on cattle raising, services, and subsistence agriculture, with the main crops being coffee (2,600 ha.), rice, beans, sugarcane, and corn.  The cattle herd had 17,000 head in 2006.  In 2005 there were 2633 rural producers but only 20 tractors.  8,700 persons were dependent on agriculture.   there were 8 public health clinics, with none carrying out diagnosis and complete therapy.  There was one hospital with 35 beds. Educational needs were met by 29 primary schools, 3 middle schools and 7 nursery schools.  There were 231 automobiles in 2006, giving a ratio of 90 inhabitants per automobile (there were 525 motorcycles).  There was 1 bank in 2007.

Neighboring municipalities are:  Padre Paraíso - Catuji - Itaipé - Novo Cruzeiro - Araçuaí.  The distance to Belo Horizonte is 536 km.  The distance to the nearest major population center, Teófilo Otoni is 80 km.

Social Indicators 

Caraí is ranked low on the MHDI and was one of the poorest municipalities in the state and in the country in 2000.
MHDI: .636 (2000)
State ranking: 775 out of 853 municipalities
National ranking: 4,001 out of 5,138 municipalities in 2000
Life expectancy: 67
Literacy rate: 65 
Combined primary, secondary and tertiary gross enrolment ratio: .787
Per capita income (monthly): R$84.00 
Degree of urbanization: 31.94
Percentage of urban residences connected to sewage system: 73.30
Infant mortality rate: 35.44 

The above figures can be compared with those of Poços de Caldas, which had an MHDI of .841, the highest in the state of Minas Gerais.  The highest in the country was São Caetano do Sul in the state of São Paulo with an MHDI of .919.  The lowest was Manari in the state of Pernambuco with an MHDI of .467 out of a total of 5504 municipalities in the country .

See also
List of municipalities in Minas Gerais

References

Municipalities in Minas Gerais